Robert M. Astley (born 1944), a Fellow of the  Canadian Institute of Actuaries, was the chairman of the Canada Pension Plan Investment Board.

Biography
Astley  has been a director of the  CPP Investment Board since September 2006, and succeeded its Chairmen of the Board, Gail Cook-Bennett, effective October 2008.

Astley  is also a Director of the Bank of Montreal  and chairman of its human resources and management compensation committee.

Astley was formerly the president of Sun Life Financial Canada, president and CEO of Clarica Life Insurance Company,  chair of Canadian Life and Health Insurance Association. In 2004 he was succeeded by Kevin Dougherty.  Astley is also a former Chair of Wilfrid Laurier University, a former member of the Dean’s Advisory Council, Laurier School of Business & Economics and a former Chair of the K-W Symphony.

Astley graduated from the University of Manitoba with an Honours degree in Science.

Defamation suit

On  May 31, 2011, the Toronto Star reported that Astley won $650,000 in a defamation suit against shareholder activist, Robert Verdun.

References

1944 births
Living people
Canadian actuaries
Canadian chairpersons of corporations
Directors of Bank of Montreal
Canadian chief executives
University of Manitoba alumni
Canadian corporate directors
Sun Life Financial
CPP Investment Board directors
Canadian financiers